The 2021–22 season was the 78th season in the existence of FC Nantes and the club's 18th consecutive season in the top flight of French football. In addition to the domestic league, Nantes participated in this season's edition of the Coupe de France.

Players

First-team squad

Out on loan

Transfers

In

Out

Pre-season and friendlies

Competitions

Overall record

Ligue 1

League table

Results summary

Results by round

Matches
The league fixtures were announced on 25 June 2021.

Coupe de France

Statistics

Goalscorers

Notes

References

FC Nantes seasons
Nantes